Tiziano Pasquali (born 14 July 1994) is an Italian rugby union footballer who plays for Treviso. He plays as a prop.

Pasquali came through the Leicester Tigers academy system to make his debut in the 2013–14 LV Cup.

He attended Merchiston Castle School with Scottish international scrum halves Sam Hidalgo-Clyne and Scott Steele.

In 2012 and 2013, Pasquali was named in the Italy Under 20 squad.
On 18 August 2019, he was named in the final 31-man squad for the 2019 Rugby World Cup.

References

External links 
It's Rugby England Profile
 Leicester Tigers Profile

1994 births
Living people
People educated at Merchiston Castle School
Rugby union props
Italian rugby union players
Leicester Tigers players
Sportspeople from Rome
Italian expatriate rugby union players
Italian expatriate sportspeople in England
Expatriate rugby union players in England
Italy international rugby union players
Doncaster Knights players
Benetton Rugby players